Glenn H. Mullin (born Jun 22, 1949 in Quebec, Canada) is a Tibetologist, Buddhist writer, translator of classical Tibetan literature and teacher of Tantric Buddhist meditation. 

Mullin has written over twenty-five books on Tibetan Buddhism. Many of these focus on the lives and works of the early Dalai Lamas. Some of his other titles include Tsongkhapa's Six Yogas of Naropa and The Practice of Kalachakra (Snow Lion); Death and Dying: The Tibetan Tradition (Arkana/Viking Penguin); Mystical Verses of a Mad Dalai Lama (Quest Books); The Mystical Arts of Tibet (Longstreet Press); and The Fourteen Dalai Lamas, as well as The Female Buddhas (Clear Light Books). He has also worked as a field specialist on three Tibet-related films and five television documentaries, and has co-produced five audio recordings of Tibetan sacred music.

Biography 
Glenn Mullin lived in the Indian Himalayas between 1972 and 1984, where he studied philosophy, literature, meditation, yoga, and the enlightenment culture under thirty-five living masters from the four schools of Tibetan Buddhism. His two principal tantric gurus were the masters Ling Rinpoche (1903–1983) and Trijang Rinpoche (1901–1981), who were best known as the senior and junior tutors of the present (14th) Dalai Lama. Mullin's other teachers and initiation masters include the Dalai Lama, the 41st Sakya Trizin Rinpoche, Kalu Rinpoche, Ngakpa Yeshe Dorje Rinpoche, Tai Situ Rinpoche, Khenchen Konchok Gyaltsen, Geshe Ngawang Dargyey, Geshey Rabten, and Gongsar Tulku.

After returning to North America in 1984, Mullin founded The Mystical Arts of Tibet. This association, under his direction, facilitated music and dance tours of Tibetan monks in North America. The first such tours to reach the west, they also included demonstrations of mandala sand paintings. The association had the objectives to "contribute mystically to world peace and planetary healing [and] raise awareness of the Tibet situation" at that time. Moreover, the association generated funds for the Tibetan refugees in India and later dedicated its mission to the activities of Drepung Loseling, the largest of Tibet's monastic universities.

Awards 
In 2002 his book The Fourteen Dalai Lamas was nominated for the NAPRA ("New Alternatives for Publishers, Retailers and Artists") award for best book, and in 2004 his book The Female Buddhas won a Best Book Award from Foreword Magazine.

Tibetan art exhibits 

Mullin used his international connections to organize and/or curate Tibetan art shows, including:

The Flying Mystics of Tibetan Buddhism, Oglethorpe University, 2004
Female Buddhas: Women of Enlightenment in Tibetan Mysticism, Bruce Museum of Arts and Science, 2005
Portals to Shangri-La: Masterpieces from Buddhist Mongolia, Oglethorpe University, 2006.

Bibliography

Translations

References

External links 

 
 The Mystical Arts of Tibet

Tibetologists
1949 births
Living people
Canadian Buddhists
Spiritual teachers
Tibetan Buddhism writers
Tibetan Buddhists from Canada